In human anatomy, the inferior epigastric artery is an artery that arises from the external iliac artery. It is accompanied by the inferior epigastric vein; inferiorly, these two inferior epigastric vessels together travel within the lateral umbilical fold (which represents the lateral border of Hesselbach's triangle, the area through which direct inguinal hernias protrude.) The inferior epigastric artery then traverses the arcuate line of rectus sheath to enter the rectus sheath, then anastomoses with the superior epigastric artery within the rectus sheath.

Structure

Origin 
The inferior epigastric artery arises from the external iliac artery, immediately superior to the inguinal ligament.

Course and relations 
It curves forward in the subperitoneal tissue, and then ascends obliquely along the medial margin of the abdominal inguinal ring; continuing its course upward, it pierces the transversalis fascia, and, passing in front of the linea semicircularis, ascends between the rectus abdominis muscle and the posterior lamella of its sheath.

It finally divides into numerous branches, which anastomose, above the umbilicus, with the superior epigastric branch of the internal thoracic artery and with the lower intercostal arteries.

As the inferior epigastric artery passes obliquely upward from its origin it lies along the lower and medial margins of the abdominal inguinal ring, and behind the commencement of the spermatic cord.

The vas deferens, as it leaves the spermatic cord in the male, and the round ligament of the uterus in the female, winds around the lateral and posterior aspects of the artery.

Anastomoses 
It anastomoses with the superior epigastric artery.

Clinical significance

Hernia 
The inferior epigastric artery may lie close to an inguinal hernia, so acts as a useful landmark.

Surgery 
The inferior epigastric artery may be damaged during laparoscopic surgery. It may also be damaged when manually finding the peritoneum beneath the rectus abdominis muscle.

Additional images

See also 
Terms for anatomical location
Hesselbach's triangle

References

External links 
  - "Incisions and the contents of the rectus sheath."
  - "Anterior Abdominal Wall: Blood Vessels in the Rectus sheath"
 
 
 
 
 

Arteries of the abdomen